Isaiah Piñeiro (born February 2, 1995) is a Puerto Rican professional basketball player for the Piratas de Quebradillas of the Baloncesto Superior Nacional (BSN) and the Puerto Rican national team.

High school career
Piñeiro was born in Auburn, California, United States to parents of Puerto Rican descent. Piñeiro attended Placer High School, where he played both football and basketball. In football, Piñeiro was the team's defensive MVP and earned All-League and All-State honors. In basketball, he was a two-time team MVP and earned All-League and All-Section honors.

College career
Piñeiro began his collegiate career with Sierra College, where he averaged 15.4 points and 7.4 rebounds per game as a freshman. He then transferred to Portland State, where he played all 31 games in his sophomore season averaging 12.0 points and 5.5 rebounds, while shooting 50.7 from the field and 76.3 from the free throw line.

Piñeiro sat out the 2016–17 season after being transferred to San Diego. In his redshirt junior year, Piñeiro earned First-team All-WCC honors as he led the team in scoring (15.7 ppg) and rebounding (6.2 rpg), while averaging 49.1 from the field and 78.3 from the free throw line. In his redshirt senior year, Piñeiro earned another First-team All-WCC as he became the all-time leader in single-season points (677 points), field goals made (232), and games played (36).

Professional career

Stockton Kings (2019–2020)
After going undrafted in the 2019 NBA draft, Piñeiro was named a member of the Sacramento Kings for the 2019 NBA Summer League season. Over 5 games, he averaged 4.6 points in 14 minutes per game.

On July 30, 2019, Piñeiro signed with the Sacramento Kings, a reported one-year partially guaranteed contract. On October 11, 2019, Piñeiro was waived by the Kings but was ultimately signed to their NBA G League affiliate, the Stockton Kings. On December 15, 2019, Piñeiro tallied 24 points, 16 rebounds and six steals in a victory over the South Bay Lakers. He averaged 9.6 points and 5 rebounds per game.

VEF Rīga (2020–2021)
On August 5, 2020, Piñeiro signed with VEF Rīga of the LEBL. He averaged 10.6 points, 5.5 rebounds and 1.9 assists per game.

Darüşşafaka (2021–present)
On June 28, 2021, he has signed with Darüşşafaka Tekfen of the Basketball Super League.

National team career
Piñeiro was named in the preliminary 17-man roster of Puerto Rico for the 2019 FIBA Basketball World Cup. On August, 28, 2019, it was announced that Piñeiro had made the Puerto Rican squad for the tournament.

On August 31, 2019, Piñeiro made his debut for the Puerto Rican national team with 8 points, 4 rebounds and 1 steal in 12 minutes in a 83–81 win over Iran.

Career statistics

College

|-
| style="text-align:left;"| 2015–16
| style="text-align:left;"| Portland State
| 31 || 20 || 22.8 || .507 || .321 || .763 || 5.5 || 1.1 || 1.1 || .5 || 12.0
|-
| style="text-align:left;"| 2017–18
| style="text-align:left;"| San Diego
| 34 || 30 || 28.1 || .491 || .346 || .783 || 6.2 || 2.1 || 1.2 || .8  || 15.7
|-
| style="text-align:left;"| 2018–19
| style="text-align:left;"| San Diego
| 36 || 36 || 34.7 || .487 || .336 || .820 || 9.4 || 2.1 || 1.2 || .5  || 18.8
|- class="sortbottom"
| style="text-align:center;" colspan="2"| Career
| 101 || 86 || 28.8 || .493 || .338 || .794 || 7.1 || 1.8 || 1.2 || .6 || 15.7

References

External links
 San Diego Toreros bio
 FIBA profile

1995 births
Living people
2019 FIBA Basketball World Cup players
American men's basketball players
American sportspeople of Puerto Rican descent
Basketball players from California
BK VEF Rīga players
Darüşşafaka Basketbol players
Junior college men's basketball players in the United States
People from Auburn, California
Portland State Vikings men's basketball players
Power forwards (basketball)
Puerto Rican men's basketball players
San Diego Toreros men's basketball players
Sierra College alumni
Small forwards
Sportspeople from Greater Sacramento
Stockton Kings players